Randy Thomas Lanier (born 1954) is a professional race car driver and convicted drug trafficker from the United States. He is best known for his racing efforts in the mid-1980s, including winning the 1984 IMSA Camel GT title for the wholly independent Blue Thunder Racing team, and for being arrested for marijuana smuggling in 1988 to support his racing efforts.

Personal life
Lanier was born in 1954 in Lynchburg, Virginia to a family of tobacco farmers.. At age 13, he moved to Miami, Florida.  When he was caught with an ounce of cannabis, he dropped out of high school to avoid suspension but later earned his GED. Lanier worked in construction to make a living.

In 1976 he married his wife Pam. They had a daughter, Brandie in 1980 and a son Glen in 1987, who was named after Lanier's younger brother who was killed in a motorcycle accident at the age of 16. He has other siblings as well. The couple divorced in the mid-1980s in an attempt to protect their house and other property when they became fearful of the authorities catching up with Lanier's illegal activities.

In 1986, Lanier became romantically involved with Maria De La Luz Maggi, and she accompanied him during his time as a fugitive. In 1993, Maggi was convicted of money laundering, and by the time she was released from prison in 1999, the two were divorced.

Some time after his 2014 release from prison, Lanier moved in with his ex-wife, Pam, and the two are planning to marry. According to a 2021 Netflix documentary about Lanier, "Need For Weed", he is a brand ambassador for a medical marijuana company and plans to continue racing with them as a sponsor.

Motorsports career
Lanier began his motorsport career in 1978, following a meeting with the Sports Car Club of America at an auto show taking place in Miami Beach Convention Center on how to make a start in racing, he bought himself a 1957 Porsche 356 Speedster, where he used it to compete in E Production at the SCCA Southeast Regional Championship, eventually winning the class in 1980.

He made his IMSA Camel GT series debut at the 1981 Daytona Finale, partnering with Dale Whittington, finishing 30th. The following season at the 24 Hours of Daytona, he was approached by a crew member for the North American Racing Team to fill in for Janet Guthrie, who was unable to race due to illness. Partnering with Bob Wollek and Edgar Dören, the trio ran in 3rd place for 18 hours until their run ended when Lanier took over at dawn on his first lap, considered by fellow driver Desiré Wilson to be unsuited to drive as he had been seen previously acting nervously in the pits, he drove the car off course destroying the suspension.

He was invited by the same team to partner with Preston Henn and Denis Morin at the 24 Hours of Le Mans, retiring after they ran out of fuel. At Lanier's fifth race at the 6 Hours of Mosport, he brought an ex-works March 82G Chevrolet, scoring his first podium finish with a third, and then another at the Mid-Ohio 6 Hours.

In 1984, after driving for a variety of teams in the previous seasons, including a second place at the 24 Hours of Daytona, he formed his own team, Blue Thunder Racing, with Bill Whittington and crew chief Keith Leyton consisting of two March GTPs.

Earlier in the season, Whittington led the season, allowing Lanier to take over after the Charlotte 500. With the help of Whittington, who taught Lanier how to set up the car, he took six wins, enough to score a driver's championship with one race to remain along with the Most Improved Driver award, despite having a lack of sponsorship and being a wholly independent team, unsupported by March Engineering. Another reason for his success was that the team employed the services of talented engine builder Ryan Falconer, who rebuilt the engines after each race.

Lanier began to focus on his Indycar career, with the hope of winning the Indianapolis 500. He drove for Arciero Racing, intending to commit full-time for the 1986 season. For the following season, Lanier would also drive for Joest Racing for both the Daytona 24 Hours and Miami. After poor form in the previous year, Lanier would improve his form by finishing six of the nine races he entered including his 10th-place finish at the Indy 500, winning the Rookie of The Year honor and taking the fastest qualifying time for a rookie that year, an average of 209.964 MPH, beating the previous record set by Michael Andretti in 1984. His final race was at the Michigan 500 where he collided into a wall at 214 MPH following a tire blow out, breaking his right femur and shortly after this, he was arrested. Prior to that, he drove in 18 CART races in 1985 and 1986.

A year after his release from federal custody, Lanier returned to the track, coaching and racing with Rally Baby Racing, and the Road & Track teams in BMW E30s at the Mid-Ohio Sports Car Course in the American Endurance Racing series.

Drug conviction and imprisonment

Lanier's presence in Florida during his youth has been suggested as a potential precursor to his later involvement in the drug trade.

Shortly after moving to Broward County, Lanier discovered cannabis at 14 when he began enjoying it recreationally. At 15, he began to sell drugs on the side. At the age of 20, he bought an $18,000 (equivalent to $ in )  Magnum go-fast boat, for recreational use, with money he made as a marijuana dealer. Later as suggested by a friend, he took the opportunity to use this to smuggle a ton of marijuana out of the Bahamas and took this as an opportunity to make a small sideline to his personal water craft rental business.

He later took to Ben Kramer, who raced in offshore powerboat racing, as a business partner. Together, their haul grew from a  wooden trawler that was used to carry  of drugs to a fleet of tugboats that was used to haul barges.

As Lanier defeated the heavily sponsored and factory supported oppositions of the Group 44 Racing Jaguar XJR-5 and Löwenbräu-sponsored Holbert Racing Porsche 962, the sudden racing successes began to raise questions about the team's source of finance and thus Lanier was under investigation from the FBI. Lanier along with Eugene Fischer and Ben Kramer, owner of Apache boats; and twelve others ran a multi-million dollar drugs empire between 1982 and 1986 when the arrest took place. Kramer was the great-nephew and one of the putative heirs of a top boss of the U.S. crime syndicate, Meyer Lansky.

A week prior to the Indy time trials, his former driving partner Bill Whittington was arrested and Lanier's name began to surface. Shortly after his Indy 500 drive, he made his largest haul of 165,000 lbs and had considered retiring from the drugs trade. Months after an Illinois dealer was arrested when a local state trooper discovered a small haul of cannabis in a broken down truck. Lanier's business partner and brother-in-law, Ronald Harris Ball, was arrested and denied bail.

Since many of these drugs were distributed in Illinois, his trial was conducted  by Judge James L. Foreman in the Southern District of Illinois in January 1987. He was convicted of importing and distributing over 300 tons of Colombian marijuana, believed to be worth $68 million by prosecutors and was due to be sentenced when he disappeared.

He was believed to have fled to Puerto Rico, but fled first to France, where he went into hiding in Monte Carlo, and later went into hiding in Antigua, where he kept properties, and was later arrested on October 26 whilst fishing. Lanier had also cut a deal after his arrest for conspiracy to distribute marijuana, but at the last minute refused to testify against Jack Kramer, father of Ben.

Lanier and his partner Ben Kramer received life without parole sentences on October 4, 1988 under the newly enacted Continuing Criminal Enterprise statute (also known as the "Super Drug Kingpin" law), owing to their refusal to cooperate with the prosecution. The Whittington brothers who were also involved received a lighter sentence. Lanier filed an appeal based on the fact that later RICO convictions were not nearly as lengthy, but lost the appeal. He was initially placed in Leavenworth Federal Penitentiary and was later transferred to the higher security United States Penitentiary I in Coleman. He spent his time in prison exercising, playing chess and answering letters sent by race fans.

Maggi, who married Lanier on August 31, 1990, at Oxford Federal Correctional Institution in Wisconsin., was sentenced on April 30, 1993, to nine years in prison for money laundering. She pleaded guilty in September the previous year to conspiracy and obstruction and later successfully appealed to have it reduced from 108 months to 97.

She was released in 1999: by that time she was no longer married to Lanier.

Release from prison

Otherwise serving a life sentence, for reasons undisclosed under sealed motions, Lanier was scheduled to be released from prison, with a discharge date of October 15, 2014, which was reportedly confirmed to Autoweek magazine insiders by Jim Porter, first assistant U.S. Attorney for the Southern District of Illinois. The Federal Bureau of Prisons website also confirmed Lanier's date of discharge conditional to the requirement that he spends six months in a halfway house before entering a three-year period of supervised release where he would be disallowed alcohol and firearms. Lanier stated that he had a job awaiting him at a classic car museum in Florida, said to be for Preston Henn, owner of Fort Lauderdale Swap Shop.

In 2015 Lanier took part in a race in Mid Ohio, driving for Rally Baby Racing, which was covered in-depth by Road & Track magazine.

Motorsports career results

American open–wheel racing results
(key)

CART

Indy 500 results

Complete 24 Hours of Le Mans results

Complete IMSA GT results

Notes

Sources

External links
motorsport.com profile
ChampCarStats.com statistics
New York Times: Driver Jailed
 New York Times:Randy Lanier Sought
Findlaw.com article on Lanier's case
Hemp News

Motorsport.com article on Riverside '84
Los Angeles Times article on crime and imprisonment
Indy Car Vice – Jon Wertheim, Sports Illustrated

1954 births
Indianapolis 500 drivers
Indianapolis 500 Rookies of the Year
Champ Car drivers
Atlantic Championship drivers
American cannabis traffickers
American sportspeople convicted of crimes
Living people
Prisoners and detainees of the United States federal government
American prisoners sentenced to life imprisonment
Prisoners sentenced to life imprisonment by the United States federal government
IMSA GT Championship drivers
Sportspeople from Lynchburg, Virginia
Racing drivers from Virginia
Auto racing controversies